A Broken Frame is the second studio album by English electronic music band Depeche Mode, released on 27 September 1982 by Mute Records. The album was written entirely by Martin Gore and was recorded as a trio after the departure of Vince Clarke, who had left and formed Yazoo with singer Alison Moyet. Alan Wilder was part of a second band tour in the United Kingdom prior to the release of A Broken Frame, but had not officially joined yet and does not appear on the album.

Critical reception and legacy

Writing in Smash Hits, Peter Silverton observed that A Broken Frame, in contrast to the group's early post-Clarke singles which he thought showed "a lack of purpose", "makes a virtue of their tinkly-bonk whimsy". In contrast, Melody Maker wrote that, although "ambitious and bold", "A Broken Frame – as its name suggests – marks the end of a beautiful dream", a comment on the departure of main songwriter Clarke. Reviewer Steve Sutherland considered the songs "daft aspirations to art", the album's musical and thematic "larcenies" sounding like "puerile infatuations papering over anonymity". At the same time, Sutherland acknowledged that the group's increasing complexity "sounds less the result of exterior persuasion than an understandable, natural development", although he finally concluded that Depeche Mode remain (in contrast to Clarke's new group Yazoo) "essentially vacuous".

The comments of Noise! magazine's "DH" (most likely Noise! contributor Dave Henderson) showed greater prescience. "DH" said that the album "falls together well and shows we can expect a lot more from the clean cut quartet", adding "[a]t times it reaches high points far exceeding their first album."

In a retrospective review for AllMusic, Ned Raggett described A Broken Frame as "a notably more ambitious effort than the pure pop/disco of the band's debut", with much of the album "forsaking earlier sprightliness... for more melancholy reflections about love gone wrong". He added: "More complex arrangements and juxtaposed sounds, such as the sparkle of breaking glass in 'Leave in Silence', help give this underrated album even more of an intriguing, unexpected edge."

In 1990, while promoting their album Violator, songwriter Martin Gore lamented parts of the album, saying, "I regret all that sickly boy-next-door stuff of the early days... musically A Broken Frame was a mish-mash".

Cover image
Despite being a photograph, the cover artwork is intended to resemble a painting. It depicts a woman cutting grain in an East Anglian field, near Duxford in Cambridgeshire. It was taken by Brian Griffin (who had previously taken the cover photograph for Speak & Spell and press photos for the band) using a mixture of natural and artificial lighting. Griffin cited as inspirations the socialist realism of Soviet Russia, especially the work of Kazimir Malevich, and German Romanticism. Griffin has displayed on his website a gallery of alternative images from the same shoot. Later releases of the album on vinyl (2007) and compact disc (2009) feature slightly different takes of the shot. It was also featured on the cover of Lifes 1990 edition of "World's Best Photographs 1980–1990".

Tour

The tour began in October 1982 in Chippenham, England. The jaunt eventually reached 12 countries, which included the group's first shows in Asia, before wrapping up with a one-off festival appearance in Schüttorf, West Germany, in May 1983. A tour in support of the act's subsequent studio release, Construction Time Again, followed in September.

Selected tracks from the 25 October 1982 show at the Hammersmith Odeon in London have been published on the "Get the Balance Right!", "Everything Counts" and "Love, in Itself" limited-edition 12-inch singles.

Track listing

 Some original US CD copies of the album tacked the intro of "The Sun & the Rainfall" onto the end of "Shouldn't Have Done That", making the duration of "The Sun & the Rainfall" 4:54.
 Dave Gahan sings lead vocals on all songs except "Shouldn't Have Done That" which is a duet with Gore. "Nothing to Fear" and "Further Excerpts From: My Secret Garden" are instrumental.

2006 Collectors Edition (CD + DVD)
 Disc one is a hybrid SACD/CD with a multi-channel SACD layer. The track listing is identical to the 1982 UK release, except "Satellite" which is 4:43 long and contains a slight edit, or error, at the beginning of the track.
 Disc two is a DVD which includes A Broken Frame in DTS 5.1, Dolby Digital 5.1 and PCM Stereo plus bonus material.

Additional material
 "Depeche Mode: 1982 (The Beginning of Their So-Called Dark Phase)" (27-minute video)

Personnel
Credits adapted from the liner notes of A Broken Frame.

Depeche Mode
 David Gahan
 Martin Gore
 Andrew Fletcher

Technical
 Daniel Miller – production
 Depeche Mode – production
 John Fryer – engineering
 Eric Radcliffe – engineering

Artwork
 Brian Griffin – photography
 Martyn Atkins – design
 Ching Ching Lee – calligraphy

Charts

Certifications

Marsheaux cover version

In 2015, Greek synth-pop duo Marsheaux released a complete cover version of A Broken Frame on Undo Records. While the reviewer for Release Magazine wrote that this version was not "anything essential" but well done, other reviews were more detailed. The Electricity Club found influences of And One in the cover of "The Sun & the Rainfall" and concluded that Marsheaux had "used unconventional sounds and vocals to make this record their own". Reviews from Germany noted that Marsheaux had elaborated on the assets and downsides of the original release. According to Westdeutsche Allgemeine Zeitung, the kitschy sides of the early Depeche Mode album were deliberately uncovered in tracks like "The Meaning of Love", while the Sonic Seducer lauded Marsheaux's darker and slower interpretation of this song.

References

External links

 Album information from the official Depeche Mode website
 Official remaster info

1982 albums
Albums produced by Daniel Miller (music producer)
Depeche Mode albums
Mute Records albums